Pythonomorpha was originally proposed by paleontologist Edward Drinker Cope (1869) as a reptilian order comprising mosasaurs, which he believed to be close relatives of Ophidia (snakes). The etymology of the term Pythonomorpha comes from the Greek Python (a monstrous snake from Greek mythology) and morphe ("form"), and refers to the generally serpentine body plan of members of the group. Cope wrote, "In the mosasauroids, we almost realize the fictions of snake-like dragons and sea-serpents, in which men have been ever prone to indulge. On account of the ophidian part of their affinities, I have called this order Pythonomorpha." Cope incorporated two families, the Clidastidae (now defunct but including only Clidastes) and the Mosasauridae (including Macrosaurus [?=Tylosaurus], Mosasaurus, and Platecarpus).

However, a close relationship between mosasaurs and snakes was rejected by most 20th-century herpetologists and paleontologists, who sought, instead, to demonstrate a close relationship between mosasaurs and varanid (monitor) lizards and who generally considered snakes to have evolved from terrestrial, burrowing lizards (see, for example, Russell, 1967). Cope's Pythonomorpha was later resurrected by a number of paleontologists (Lee, 1997; Caldwell et Lee, 1997) who had conducted cladistic analyses that seemed to show that snakes and mosasaurs may have been more closely related to one another than either were to the varanid lizards, and that snakes more likely arose from aquatic ancestors. As redefined by Lee (1997), the monophyletic Pythonomorpha consists of "the most recent common ancestor of mosasauroids and snakes, and all its descendants." This would include the aigialosaurs, dolichosaurs, coniasaurs, mosasaurs, and all snakes. Lee (1997) was able to show no less than 38 synapomorphies supporting Pythonomorpha.

If Pythonomorpha is valid, it contains not only mosasauroids but the Ophidiomorpha, which was defined as a node-based clade containing the most recent common ancestor of dolichosaurs, adriosaurs, Aphanizocnemus, and fossil and extant Ophidia and all of its descendants.

However, the validity of Pythonomorpha is still debated; indeed, there is no consensus about the relationships of snakes or mosasaurs to each other, or to the rest of the lizards. An analysis by Conrad (2008) placed mosasaurs with varanoid lizards, and snakes with skinks, while an analysis by Gauthier et al. (2012) suggested that mosasaurs are more primitive than either snakes or varanoids. However, a combined morphological and molecular analysis by Reeder et al. (2015) recovered Mosasauria and Serpentes as sisters, consistent with Pythonomorpha.

References

Further reading 

 Caldwell, M. W., Carroll, R. L. et Kaiser, H. 1995: The pectoral girdle and forelimb of Carsosaurus marchesetti (Aegialosauridae), with a preliminary phylogenetic analysis of Mosasauroids and varanoids. Journal of Vertebrate Paleontology 15(3): 516-531.
 Caldwell, M. W. et Lee, M. S. Y. 1997. A snake with legs from the marine Cretaceous of the Middle East. Nature 386:705-709.
 Caldwell, M. W. 1999. Squamate phylogeny and the relationships of snakes and mosasauroids. Zoological Journal of the Linnean Society 125:115-147.
 Cope, E. D. 1869. On the reptilian orders Pythonomorpha and Streptosauria. Proceedings of the Boston Society of Natural History 12:250–266.
 Lee, M. S. Y. 1997. The phylogeny of varanoid lizards and the affinities of snakes. Philosophical Transactions of the Royal Society of London B 352:53-91.
 Lee, M. S. Y. et Caldwell, M. W.. 2000. Adriosaurus and the affinities of mosasaurs, dolichosaurs, and snakes. Journal of Paleontology 74(5):915-937.
 Russell, D. A., 1967. Systematics and morphology of American mosasaurs. Peabody Museum of Natural History, Yale University, Bulletin 23.
 Gauthier, J. A., Kearney, M., Maisano, J.A., Rieppel, O. et Behkke, A. D. B. 2012: Assembling the Squamate Tree of Life: Perspectives from the Phenotype and the Fossil Record. Bulletin of the Peabody Museum of Natural History 53(1):3-308.

Anguimorpha
Bajocian first appearances
Extant Middle Jurassic first appearances
Taxa named by Edward Drinker Cope